Miguel Robles (born 22 October 1974) is a Bolivian fencer. He competed in the individual sabre event at the 1996 Summer Olympics.

References

External links
 

1974 births
Living people
Bolivian male sabre fencers
Olympic fencers of Bolivia
Fencers at the 1996 Summer Olympics